Matsuo may refer to:

Places
Matsuo, Chiba
Matsuo, Iwate
Mount Matsuo
Matsuo Station (disambiguation)
Siege of Matsuo
Matsuo mine

Other uses
Matsuo (name)